"Staying Up" is a song by Norwegian DJ and record producer Matoma and British pop rock band The Vamps. The song was released as a digital download on 31 August 2017 through Parlophone and FFRR. This marks the second collaboration between Matoma and the band, the first being All Night.

Music video
A music video to accompany the release of "Staying Up" was first released onto YouTube on 8 September 2017 at a total length of three minutes and seventeen seconds. The music video was shot in Seljord, Hjartdal and Notodden.

Track listing

Charts

Release history

References

2017 songs
2017 singles
Music videos shot in Norway
Song articles with missing songwriters
Matoma songs
The Vamps (British band) songs